was a village located in Higashiyatsushiro District, Yamanashi Prefecture, Japan.

As of 2003, the village had an estimated population of 3,616 and a population density of 267.85 persons per km². The total area was 13.50 km².

On February 20, 2006, Toyotomi, along with the towns of Tatomi and Tamaho (all from Nakakoma District), was merged to create the city of Chūō.

External links
 Chūō official website 

Dissolved municipalities of Yamanashi Prefecture
Chūō, Yamanashi